The following highways are numbered 10A:

United States
 Florida State Road 10A
 County Road 10A (Florida)
 New York State Route 10A
 County Route 10A (Cayuga County, New York)
 County Route 10A (Chenango County, New York)
 North Carolina Highway 10A (Conover) (former)
 North Carolina Highway 10A (Gibsonville) (former)
 North Carolina Highway 10A (High Point) (former)
 Oklahoma State Highway 10A
 Route 10A (Vermont–New Hampshire)